Sanjay Chauhan (born 12 December 1966) is an Indian businessman and former first-class cricketer.

Chauhan was born at Delhi. He later studied at the University of Delhi, where he was at the time one of three people to receive the Mark of Honour, before going up to Worcester College at the University of Oxford as a Rhodes Scholar. While studying at Oxford, he made six appearances in first-class cricket for Oxford University in 1989–90. Chauhan scored 51 runs in his six matches, with a high score of 25, in addition to taking a single wicket from 16 overs bowled.

After graduating from Oxford, Chauhan moved to the United States where he became an accountant. He later served as chief financial officer (CFO) and asset management leader at Urban America, a New Jersey real estate firm, before becoming CFO of Jonathan Rose Companies in June 2015.

References

External links

1966 births
Living people
People from Delhi
Delhi University alumni
Indian Rhodes Scholars
Alumni of Worcester College, Oxford
Indian cricketers
Oxford University cricketers
Indian expatriates in the United States